Landau–Placzek ratio is a ratio of the integrated intensity of Rayleigh scattering to the combined integrated intensity of Brillouin scattering of a triplet frequency spectrum of light scattered by homogenous liquids or gases. The triplet consists of two frequency shifted Brillouin scattering and a central unshifted Rayleigh scattering line split. The triplet structure was explained by Lev Landau and George Placzek in 1934 in a short publication, summarizing major results of their analysis. Landau and Placzek noted in their short paper that a more detailed discussion will be published later although that paper does not seem to have been published. However, a detailed discussion is provided in Lev Landau and Evgeny Lifshitz's book.

The Landau–Placzek ratio is defined as

where 
 is the integral intensity of central Rayleigh peak 
 is the integral intensity of Brillouin peak.

The Landau–Placzek formula provides an approximate theoretical prediction for the Landau–Placzek ratio,

where 
 is the specific heat at constant pressure 
 is the specific heat at constant volume.

References

Scattering, absorption and radiative transfer (optics)
Scattering
Light
Fiber-optic communications
Lev Landau